Vladilen Zakharov (born January 12, 1994) is a Russian former professional ice hockey player. He played with Metallurg Magnitogorsk of the Kontinental Hockey League (KHL).

Zakharov made his Kontinental Hockey League debut playing with Metallurg Magnitogorsk during the 2014–15 KHL season.

References

External links

1994 births
Living people
Metallurg Magnitogorsk players
Russian ice hockey forwards
People from Magnitogorsk
Sportspeople from Chelyabinsk Oblast